The 2019 Baltimore Ravens season was the franchise's 24th in the National Football League (NFL) and their 12th under head coach John Harbaugh. This was the team's first season under general manager Eric DeCosta following the retirement of Ozzie Newsome.

This season also marked the first year in which Terrell Suggs and Joe Flacco were not on the Ravens roster since 2002 and 2007, respectively, as Suggs left to join the Arizona Cardinals (later released and signed by the eventual Super Bowl champion Kansas City Chiefs) and Flacco was traded to the Denver Broncos.

The Ravens started the season as the only NFL team with three former Heisman Trophy winners on their roster: Lamar Jackson, Mark Ingram II, and Robert Griffin III.
The Ravens were also the only NFL team to score at least 20 points in each of their games during the season. and the only team to score on more than half of their drives. By Week 13, the Ravens improved to 10–2 for the first time in franchise history and extended their winning streak to eight games, also a franchise (regular season) record. After a win against the Buffalo Bills, the Ravens won their ninth consecutive game and improved on their 10–6 record from 2018. That win also clinched a second straight playoff berth for the team. Quarterback Lamar Jackson became only the second quarterback in NFL history to run for over 1,000 yards, and the following week, he broke Michael Vick's all-time single season quarterback rushing record during the game against the New York Jets.

By Week 15, the Ravens had scored more points (430) in a single season than any other team in franchise history. In Week 15, they clinched their second straight AFC North title with a 42–21 victory over the Jets.

On December 17, the NFL announced the rosters of the 2020 Pro Bowl which included 12 Ravens, the most of any team in 2019. On January 15, 2020, Orlando Brown Jr. was added to the Pro Bowl roster, which tied the 2007 Dallas Cowboys for the NFL record for most Pro Bowlers in a single season at 13. With a Week 16 win over the Cleveland Browns, the Ravens clinched the AFC #1 seed, gaining home-field advantage throughout the AFC playoffs, and broke 500 total points, both for the first time in franchise history. The 28–10 Week 17 victory over the Pittsburgh Steelers gave the Ravens their best record in franchise history, surpassing 2006. The Ravens finished the regular season with 3,296 rushing yards, the most by any team in NFL history during a season. The Ravens became the first team in NFL history to average at least 200 passing yards and 200 rushing yards per game in the same season. The Ravens outscored their opponents by 249 points, the highest point differential in the NFL in 2019. On January 3, 2020, the Associated Press released its picks for the 2019 All-Pro Team. QB Lamar Jackson, OT Ronnie Stanley, CB Marlon Humphrey, CB Marcus Peters, and K Justin Tucker were named to the first team and G Marshal Yanda was named to the second team. The five Ravens selected to the first team were the most of any NFL team.

In the playoffs, the Ravens were upset by the Tennessee Titans in the Divisional Round, 28–12. Prior to their defeat, FiveThirtyEight had the Ravens as the favorite to win the Super Bowl since before Week 12.

Draft

Undrafted free agents

Notes
The Ravens traded their second-round selection (No. 53 overall), along with their 2018 second- and fourth-round selections to the Philadelphia Eagles in exchange for the Eagles' 2018 first- and fourth-round selections.
The Ravens traded quarterback Joe Flacco to the Denver Broncos in exchange for the Broncos' fourth-round selection (No. 113 overall).
The Ravens acquired an additional sixth-round selection in a trade that sent linebacker Kamalei Correa to the Tennessee Titans.
The Ravens traded their seventh-round selection to the Jacksonville Jaguars in exchange for center Luke Bowanko.
As the result of a negative differential of free agent signings and departures that the Ravens experienced during the  free agency period, the team received one compensatory selection for the 2019 draft — a third-round selection (No. 102 overall) – to compensate for the loss of center Ryan Jensen.
The Ravens traded their first-round selection (No. 22 overall) to the Philadelphia Eagles in exchange for the Eagles' 2019 first-, fourth-, and sixth-round selections 
The Ravens traded their third rounder (No. 102) and their first two sixes (191, 193) to the Minnesota Vikings for their third rounder (No. 93)

Staff

Final roster

Preseason

Schedule

Note
The Ravens' four preseason victories extended their preseason winning streak to 17 games.

Regular season

Schedule

Note: Intra-division opponents are in bold text.

Game summaries

Week 1: Baltimore Ravens 59, Miami Dolphins 10

The Ravens scored a franchise-high 42 points in the first half and Lamar Jackson threw five touchdown passes with no interceptions and became the youngest quarterback to achieve a perfect passer rating. All three of the Ravens' Heisman Trophy winners (Jackson, Mark Ingram II and Robert Griffin III) were involved in scoring plays.

The Dolphins gave up 49 yards on the first play from scrimmage and a total of 643 yards in the game, the most yards any Dolphins team has surrendered in a single game in franchise history. The 59 points were also the most surrendered by any Dolphins team in a regular season game.

Week 2: Baltimore Ravens 23, Arizona Cardinals 17

Lamar Jackson threw two touchdown passes, bringing him to seven through two games, setting a new franchise record for the most touchdown passes in the team's first two games of a season. Jackson also ran for a game high of 120 yards. Former Ravens' sack leader Terrell Suggs did not register a single sack against his former team.

The Cardinals were able to drive the ball within the Ravens' 5-yard line in each of the first three quarters, but the Ravens defense held them to a field goal each time.

Week 3: Kansas City Chiefs 33, Baltimore Ravens 28

The Ravens started the game strong with a 14-play, 84-yard touchdown drive that included a critical fourth down conversion. The Ravens attempt at a two-point conversion failed, so the Ravens led 6–0. The Chiefs responded on their next possession with an 11-play, 75-yard touchdown drive that was aided by a Pernell McPhee roughing the passer penalty. The Chiefs took the lead, 7–6. The Ravens offense sputtered as the Chiefs added two more touchdowns, the second of which included an 83-yard touchdown pass from Patrick Mahomes to Mecole Hardman. The Chiefs added a field goal and led 23–6 at the half.

The Ravens started the second half strong with an eight-play, 75-yard touchdown drive with all 75 yards gained on the ground. But the Chiefs responded with another touchdown. The Ravens then mounted a 13 play touchdown drive but failed for the second time in the game on a two-point conversion attempt, cutting the Chiefs' lead to 30–19. After the teams exchanged field goals, the Ravens scored on a nine-play, 70-yard drive that ended with a Lamar Jackson 9-yard touchdown run, but again, the two-point conversion failed and the Chiefs ran out the clock.

Week 4: Cleveland Browns 40, Baltimore Ravens 25

The Browns opened the scoring in the first quarter with a Baker Mayfield touchdown pass to Ricky Seals-Jones. However, the Ravens responded with a Lamar Jackson touchdown pass to Miles Boykin to tie the game at 7–7. An Austin Seibert field goal gave the Browns a 10–7 lead at halftime. In the second half, Nick Chubb had an 88-yard touchdown run to extend the Browns' lead just two plays after the Ravens had cut the score to 24–18. A Dontrell Hilliard touchdown run extended the Browns' lead to 40–18. The Ravens added a touchdown to make the final score 40–25.

Week 5: Baltimore Ravens 26, Pittsburgh Steelers 23 (OT)

The Ravens' 12 game winning streak started in Pittsburgh. They went up 3–0 with a Justin Tucker 27-yard field goal, then made it 10–0 after a 4-yard touchdown by Mark Ingram II. The Steelers pulled it back to 10–7 after Mason Rudolph found JuJu Smith-Schuster for a 35-yard touchdown pass. In the second quarter, the Ravens increased their lead as Marquise Brown caught an 11-yard pass from Lamar Jackson. A pair of Chris Boswell field goals from 41 and 29 yards made it 17–13 going into halftime. In the third quarter, Steelers quarterback Mason Rudolph was knocked unconscious after being hit by Brandon Carr and Earl Thomas. With backup quarterback Devlin Hodges at the helm, the Steelers took the lead in the third quarter with a James Conner 1-yard touchdown. In the fourth quarter, the Ravens tied it up at 20 apiece with a Tucker 26-yard field goal. The Steelers retook the lead on a 33-yard Boswell field goal. The Ravens forced overtime when Tucker hit a 48-yard field goal with 10 seconds left in regulation. In overtime, after a fumble by Smith-Schuster, Tucker kicked the game-winning 46-yard field goal.

Week 6: Baltimore Ravens 23, Cincinnati Bengals 17

The Bengals scored first when Brandon Wilson returned a kickoff 92 yards for a touchdown. The Ravens however took the lead with a Lamar Jackson 21-yard touchdown to tie the game at 7–7 followed by Mark Ingram's 1-yard touchdown run. In the second quarter, the Ravens made it 17–7 with a Justin Tucker 40-yard field goal. The Bengals followed with a Randy Bullock 22-yard field goal, to make it 17–10 at halftime. In the third quarter, the Ravens got a Tucker 49-yard field goal to make it 20–10, the quarter's only score. In the fourth quarter Tucker kicked a 21-yard field goal, and the Bengals scored on an Andy Dalton 2-yard touchdown. The Bengals' onside kick attempt failed, so the Ravens recovered the ball and ran out the clock. Ravens quarterback Lamar Jackson became the first player in the Super Bowl era to throw for more than 200 yards and run for more than 150 yards in a regular season game.

Week 7: Baltimore Ravens 30, Seattle Seahawks 16

Five days after becoming a Raven, Marcus Peters intercepted a pass from Russell Wilson and returned it for a 67-yard pick six. Peters' interception was Wilson's first of the season, and Wilson's first interception in his last 207 pass attempts. The interception gave the Ravens a 13–10 lead but the Seahawks tied the game 13–13 by the end of the first half. Late in the fourth quarter, with the Ravens nursing a 10-point lead, the Ravens defense scored its second touchdown of the game as Marlon Humphrey returned a Seahawks fumble for 18 yards and a touchdown and put the game on ice.

Week 9: Baltimore Ravens 37, New England Patriots 20

The Ravens hosted the unbeaten Patriots for the teams' first meeting since 2016, handing New England its first loss since Week 15 of the previous season as Baltimore rushed for 210 yards. On the game's first drive, the Ravens converted twice on 3rd down. Seven of the Ravens plays in the first drive were runs by Lamar Jackson, Mark Ingram II, and Gus Edwards. On a crucial third down, the Patriots had held and the Ravens would have been forced to try a field goal but a neutral zone infraction by Shilque Calhoun gave the Ravens a first down which led to a 3-yard rushing touchdown by quarterback Lamar Jackson. On the Patriots' first possession, Tom Brady threw three straight incomplete passes, which led to a punt. The next drive the Patriots held the Ravens to a field goal. The Patriots, however had to punt again after Brady was sacked by Patrick Onwuasor. With a 10–0 lead, the Ravens started the second quarter with another long drive, highlighted by a 53-yard run by Ingram and a 12-yard touchdown run by Gus Edwards. The Ravens then forced another Patriots three-and-out but Cyrus Jones muffed the punt and the Patriots got the ball back at the Baltimore 20-yard line, which led to a Brady to Mohamed Sanu touchdown. The Patriots added two field goals and ended the half trailing only by four, 17–13.

On the Patriots' first drive in the third quarter, the Ravens forced a Julian Edelman fumble which was returned 70 yards by Marlon Humphrey for a touchdown extending the Ravens lead to 24–13. The Patriots answered with a 4-yard rushing touchdown by James White. The Ravens then mounted an eight-minute, 14-play drive ending with a 5-yard pass to Nick Boyle to make the lead 30–20. In the fourth quarter, Earl Thomas intercepted a Brady pass and the Ravens mounted another 14 play drive ending with a Jackson 1-yard rushing touchdown, making the lead 37–20.

Marlon Humphrey's 70-yard fumble return was the longest fumble return in Ravens history. Also, Nick Boyle's touchdown was the first of his career. This was also the Ravens' first win over the Patriots since the 2012 AFC Championship Game in Gillette Stadium. Lamar Jackson became the first second year or rookie quarterback to defeat the Patriots since 2013.

Week 10: Baltimore Ravens 49, Cincinnati Bengals 13

The Ravens scored first when Lamar Jackson found Mark Andrews on a 2-yard touchdown pass. It was 14–0 after a Mark Ingram II 1-yard touchdown run. In the second quarter, the Bengals got a Randy Bullock 42-yard field goal; but the Ravens then pulled away as Jackson found Andrews again on a 17-yard touchdown pass to make it 21–3. Marcus Peters then returned an interception 89 yards for a touchdown to make it 28–3. The Bengals came within 18 points at halftime when Ryan Finley found Tyler Boyd on a 6-yard touchdown pass. The Ravens scored three more touchdowns to open the second half. First, Jackson ran for one from 47 yards out, then Jackson found Marquise Brown for a 20-yard touchdown pass, and then Tyus Bowser returned a fumble 33 yards for a touchdown.

With the win, the Ravens won five consecutive regular season games for the first time since 2006 and also had a season sweep of the Bengals for the first time since 2011. Lamar Jackson finished with his second perfect passer rating on the season, making him the second player in NFL history to perform the feat.

Week 11: Baltimore Ravens 41, Houston Texans 7
{{Americanfootballbox
|titlestyle=;text-align:center;
|state=autocollapse
|title=Week Eleven: Houston Texans at Baltimore Ravens – Game summary
|date=November 17
|time=1:00 p.m. EST
|road=Texans
|R1=0|R2=0|R3=0|R4=7
|home=Ravens
|H1=0|H2=14|H3=13|H4=14
|stadium=M&T Bank Stadium, Baltimore, Maryland
|attendance=70,731
|weather=Cloudy, 
|referee=Alex Kemp
|TV=CBS
|TVAnnouncers=Ian Eagle, Dan Fouts, and Evan Washburn
|reference=Recap, Game Book
|scoring=
First quarter
No scoring plays.
Second quarter
BAL – Seth Roberts 15-yard pass from Lamar Jackson (Justin Tucker kick), 9:17. Ravens 7–0. Drive: 10 plays, 90 yards, 5:46.
BAL – Mark Andrews 18-yard pass from Lamar Jackson (Justin Tucker kick), 2:14. Ravens 14–0. Drive: 7 plays, 70 yards, 4:22.
Third quarter
BAL – Mark Ingram II 25-yard pass from Lamar Jackson (Justin Tucker kick), 11:33. Ravens 21–0. Drive: 6 plays, 78 yards, 3:27.
BAL – Justin Tucker 34-yard field goal, 6:52. Ravens 24–0. Drive: 6 plays, 52 yards, 2:49.
BAL – Justin Tucker 46-yard field goal, 1:30. Ravens 27–0. Drive: 6 plays, 11 yards, 3:14.
Fourth quarter
BAL – Mark Ingram II 12-yard pass from Lamar Jackson (Justin Tucker kick), 9:50. Ravens 34–0. Drive: 8 plays, 71 yards, 4:52.HOU – Carlos Hyde 41-yard run (Ka'imi Fairbairn kick), 7:10. Ravens 34–7. Drive: 5 plays, 77 yards, 2:40.BAL – Gus Edwards 63-yard run (Justin Tucker kick), 4:01. Ravens 41–7. Drive: 5 plays, 87 yards, 3:09.|stats=
Top passers
HOU – Deshaun Watson – 18/29, 169 yards, INT
BAL – Lamar Jackson – 17/24, 222 yards, 4 TD
Top rushers
HOU – Carlos Hyde – 9 rushes, 65 yards, TD
BAL – Gus Edwards – 8 rushes, 112 yards, TD
Top receivers
HOU – DeAndre Hopkins – 7 receptions, 80 yards
BAL – Mark Andrews – 4 receptions, 75 yards, TD
}}
Jackson threw four touchdowns in the game, becoming the first quarterback in Ravens franchise history to throw four or more touchdowns in a game multiple times during the regular season. Jackson also rushed for 86 yards during the victory over the Texans making him the only quarterback in NFL history to rush for more than 60 yards in seven consecutive games.

Week 12: Baltimore Ravens 45, Los Angeles Rams 6
 
The Ravens became the fourth team in the 21st century to score touchdowns on their first six drives in a game. During the game, Lamar Jackson became the first player in NFL history to rush for at least 1,500 yards and pass for more than 3,000 yards in his first two seasons. Jackson's five touchdown passes made him the NFL's first player with that many touchdown passes in a Monday Night Football debut and the youngest player ever (22 years old) with multiple five touchdown passing games. The Ravens also won seven straight games for the first time since their 2000 Super Bowl-winning season. Jackson was also named the AFC Player of the Month for the month of November.

Week 13: Baltimore Ravens 20, San Francisco 49ers 17

The 49ers opened the game with a touchdown on their first possession, which was the first time on the season that the Ravens had allowed an opponent a touchdown on the first drive. On the following drive, 49ers QB Jimmy Garoppolo was sacked and lost a fumble. Two plays later, the Ravens scored on a 20-yard pass from Lamar Jackson to Mark Andrews. This was the 48th touchdown of the season and the most touchdowns by any Ravens team in franchise history. After a 49ers punt, Jackson orchestrated a 13-play drive culminating with him running the ball in from the 1-yard line for a touchdown. The 49ers answered with a touchdown, but the Ravens countered with a field goal and the half ended with the Ravens up by three. In the opening drive of the second half, Jackson was stripped of the ball by 49ers safety Marcell Harris at the 49ers' 20-yard line. The 49ers then completed a 14-play drive lasting almost eight-and-a-half minutes, but were forced to kick a field goal which tied the game at 17. Neither team could score in the fourth quarter until the 6:28 mark when the Ravens drove the ball down to the 49ers' 31 where Justin Tucker kicked a 49-yard game-winning field goal as time expired. With the win, the Ravens improved to 10–2 for the first time in franchise history and extend their winning streak to 8 games, also a franchise record. The Ravens were also the only AFC North team to defeat all four of their NFC West opponents in 2019.

Week 14: Baltimore Ravens 24, Buffalo Bills 17

Lamar Jackson became the second ever quarterback behind Michael Vick to reach 1,000 rushing yards. The Ravens improved to 11–2 for the first time in franchise history and extend their winning streak to nine games, also a franchise record. Also, a light moment in an otherwise competitive game occurred in the third quarter when some pages from Ravens special teams coach Randy Brown's playbook blew onto the field and Bills cornerback Tre'Davious White retrieved them. When the referee noticed that White was actually examining the pages, he ran over to White and snatched them from him.

Week 15: Baltimore Ravens 42, New York Jets 21

Lamar Jackson threw 5 touchdown passes and broke the NFL record for rushing yards by a quarterback in a season as the Ravens won the AFC North title. Mark Andrews caught his eighth touchdown of the season, breaking a franchise record for most touchdowns by a Ravens tight end in a single season, previously held by Todd Heap.

Week 16: Baltimore Ravens 31, Cleveland Browns 15

The Browns held the Ravens scoreless for the first 28 minutes of the game while they took a 6–0 lead. But with less than two minutes remaining in the half Lamar Jackson hit Mark Andrews with 2 touchdown passes and the Ravens took a 14–6 lead into the locker room at half-time.

In the second half, Jackson tossed another touchdown, this time to Mark Ingram II and then the Ravens running game sealed the victory with Mark Ingram II and Justice Hill rushing touchdowns. Lamar Jackson's touchdown pass to Mark Andrews in the second quarter broke the Ravens single-season touchdown pass record with 34, a record previously held by Vinny Testaverde. With the win, the Ravens clinched home-field advantage for the entire AFC playoffs.

The Ravens defense limited the league's top rusher, Cleveland running back Nick Chubb, to 45 yards; his lowest output of the 2019 season. Chubb had gashed the Ravens' defense for 165 yards and 3 touchdowns in their week 4 match-up. On the day after the Ravens' victory over the Browns, and due to the Ravens' having clinched home-field advantage, head coach John Harbaugh announced that quarterback Lamar Jackson, guard Marshal Yanda, safety Earl Thomas III and defensive tackle Brandon Williams will be inactive for the Week 17 game against the Pittsburgh Steelers. Harbaugh also announced that running back Mark Ingram II will not play; allowing him to recover from the calf injury he sustained in the Browns game.

Week 17: Baltimore Ravens 28, Pittsburgh Steelers 10

On a rain-soaked field, with Robert Griffin III at quarterback, the Ravens kept the ball on the ground for their first drive. The drive covered 40 yards, took 7 minutes off the clock and culminated with a 45-yard Justin Tucker field goal. After the Ravens defense forced a three-and-out, the Ravens offense, highlighted by a Gus Edwards 38-yard run, drove down the field again, this time settling for a Tucker 22-yard field goal. The Steelers took the lead early in the second quarter after a Benny Snell 4-yard touchdown run. The Ravens regained the lead, 9–7, with another Tucker field goal with 1:10 remaining in the half. The Ravens got the ball back with 54 seconds left in the half when Matthew Judon sacked Steelers quarterback Devlin Hodges forcing him to fumble. Justice Hill's 8-yard touchdown run capped a 23-yard drive for the Ravens, who ended the half with a 16–7 lead. After the teams exchanged field goals, the Ravens defense, late in the fourth quarter, stripped the ball from Steelers punter Jordan Berry and recovered it in the end zone for a touchdown. On the next Steelers possession the Ravens were awarded 2 points after Devlin Hodges was called for intentional grounding in the end zone, making the final score 28–10 Ravens.

With the win, the Ravens finished the season with a franchise best 14–2 record surpassing their 13–3 campaign in 2006. They also swept the Steelers for the first time since the 2015 season.

Standings
 Division 

 Conference 

Postseason

Schedule
The Ravens clinched a playoff berth following their Week 14 win over the Buffalo Bills. They clinched the AFC North division following their Week 15 win over the New York Jets, guaranteeing at least one home playoff game. They clinched home-field advantage throughout the AFC playoffs with their Week 16 victory against the Cleveland Browns.

Game summaries
AFC Divisional Playoffs: Tennessee Titans 28, Baltimore Ravens 12

Titans running back Derrick Henry accounted for most of the Tennessee offense, accounting for 205 of their 300 total yards. Meanwhile, Baltimore racked up 530 yards, but their three turnovers and four failed fourth-down conversion attempts proved too much to overcome. As a result, Baltimore became the first number 1 seed in the playoffs to lose to the number 6 seed since the New England Patriots lost to the New York Jets in 2010.

On the Ravens' first drive of the game, Lamar Jackson threw a pass that bounced off the hands of Mark Andrews and was intercepted by safety Kevin Byard, who returned it 31 yards, with an unnecessary roughness penalty against Jackson for a horse-collar tackle adding another 15 yards and giving Tennessee a first down on the Ravens' 35-yard line. Henry then carried the ball 4 times for 22 yards on an 8-play drive that ended with Ryan Tannehill's 12-yard touchdown pass to tight end Jonnu Smith, who made a leaping one-handed catch in the back of the end zone. After getting the ball back, Baltimore drove to a 4th-and-1 on their own 45-yard line. Jackson attempted to convert with a quarterback sneak, but he was tackled by linebacker David Long Jr. for no gain on the last play of the first quarter. On the next play, Tannehill gave the team a 14–0 lead with a 45-yard touchdown pass to Kalif Raymond. Following a punt from each team, Jackson completed a 30-yard pass to Marquise Brown and a 16-yard pass to Andrews, setting up Justin Tucker's 49-yard field goal to make the score 14–3. Then after a Titans punt, Jackson completed a 26-yard pass to Seth Roberts, as well as two completions to Brown for gains of 16 yards and 38 yards on a 91-yard drive. Tucker finished it off with a 22-yard field goal as time expired in the half, making the score 14–6 at halftime.

Baltimore took the second half kickoff and drove to a 4th-and-1 on the Titans' 18-yard line. Jackson again tried to convert with a run, but was stopped for no gain by linebacker Harold Landry. Two plays later on 3rd and 1, Henry took a handoff through the middle and ran for a 66-yard gain, to the Ravens' 6-yard line. Then when faced with 3rd and goal from the 3-yard line, Henry took a direct snap out of wildcat formation and threw a jump pass to Corey Davis for a touchdown. This gave Tennessee a 21–6 lead and made Henry the first running back to throw a touchdown pass in the postseason since Allen Rice in the 1987 season. On the first play of the Ravens' next possession, defensive end Jurrell Casey forced a fumble while sacking Jackson, which Jeffery Simmons recovered for Tennessee on the Baltimore 20-yard line. From there, the Titans drove to a 28–6 lead, scoring on a 6-play drive that ended with Tannehill's 1-yard touchdown run. Baltimore responded with a drive to the Titans' 36-yard line, only to lose the ball again with a Jackson pass that was intercepted by safety Kenny Vaccaro. After forcing Tennessee to punt, the Ravens finally managed to score a touchdown, moving the ball 83 yards in 10 plays, the longest a 27-yard run by Jackson. Jackson finished the drive with a 15-yard touchdown pass to tight end Hayden Hurst, but his subsequent two-point conversion pass was incomplete, keeping the score at 28–12. Tennessee's defense then pinned down Baltimore for the rest of the game, forcing a turnover on downs on the Ravens' final two possessions.

Henry finished the game with 30 carries for 195 yards, while also catching two passes for 7 yards and throwing a 3-yard touchdown pass. He became the first player to rush for over 180 yards twice in the same postseason. Jackson completed 31 of 59 passes for 365 yards and a touchdown, with two interceptions, while also rushing 20 times for 143 yards. This made him the first quarterback to throw for 300 yards and rush for 100 yards in a playoff game. His top receiver was Brown, who caught seven passes for 126 yards.

League rankings

* NFL record''

Individual awards

References

External links

Baltimore
Baltimore Ravens seasons
Baltimore Ravens
AFC North championship seasons
2010s in Baltimore